The 1895 Grand National was the 57th renewal of the Grand National horse race that took place at Aintree near Liverpool, England, on 29 March 1895. It was won by Wild Man From Borneo in 10 minutes 32 seconds.

Finishing Order

Non-finishers

References

 1895
March 1895 sports events
Grand National
Grand National
19th century in Lancashire